Luis Muñoz (12 February 1928 – 17 July 1989) was a Spanish bobsledder. He competed in the four-man event at the 1956 Winter Olympics.

References

1928 births
1989 deaths
Spanish male bobsledders
Olympic bobsledders of Spain
Bobsledders at the 1956 Winter Olympics
Sportspeople from Madrid